Musaba is a surname. Notable people with the surname include:

Anthony Musaba (born 2000), Dutch footballer
Richie Musaba (born 2000), Dutch footballer, twin brother of Anthony

See also
 "Parco-Museo Santa Barbara", known also as MUSABA, an open-air art museum created by Nik Spatari